"Es (Theme of Es)" (officially written 【es】~Theme of es~) is the eighth single released by Mr. Children on May 10, 1995. It debuted at No. 1 on the Japanese Oricon weekly single charts.

Along with their next single "See-Saw Game (Yūkan na Koi no Uta)," "Es (Theme of Es)" was certified as a million-selling single of 1995 by the Recording Industry Association of Japan.

Track listing

References

1995 singles
Oricon Weekly number-one singles
Mr. Children songs
Songs written by Kazutoshi Sakurai
1995 songs
Toy's Factory singles
Japanese film songs